The Buochs Airport (ICAO code LSZC Mil: LSMU) is a regional airport in the town of Buochs in the Canton of Nidwalden in Switzerland. It has a concrete runway with a length of 2000 meters and a width of 40 meters, several taxiways and hangars.

Operation
The airfield is formally the responsibility of the Swiss Air Force, but is operated by the Civil Airport Buochs AG. Since 1 January 2004, the military airfield Buochs is a "sleeping base" of the Air Force. In case of an extraordinary situation the entire military infrastructure of the airfield can be made operational again. However, there are considerations that the military withdraws completely from the airfield.

Use
Next to the aircraft cavern near the airport is the factory premises of the Pilatus Aircraft who use the airfield including for test flights.

History 

In Buochs especially the aircraft Dassault Mirage III S, Mirage IIIRS, MirageIIIBS, IIIDS Mirage and F-5E were used. Pilatus use this airfield for all test- and delivery flights for the products manufactured by Pilatus aircraft such as the Pilatus P-3, Pilatus PC-7, Pilatus PC-8D Twin Porter, Pilatus PC-9, Pilatus PC-12 and Pilatus PC-21 
Buochs is equipped with an Aircraft cavern, also was A2 motorway built so that MirageIIIS using JATO booster rockets could take off from this highway. But this opportunity was never used .  The air base is, at both end of the runway, equipped with retractable Arresting gear devices (used by the F/A-18 and in case of a problem by the F-5).

The airfield was active until 2003; used for fighter jets of the Swiss Air Force. It was the home of militia Squadron 8 with F-5E, along with the reconnaissance squadron 10 with Mirage IIIRS.  With the end of Buochs as active military airfield and the MirageIIIRS pass out of service, 2 MirageIIIRS received about a special painting in black and white. The in the 1999 decommissioning Mirage IIIS were turned to a hardstand at Buochs Airport for several years until their scrapping.  Also often Pilatus PC-6, PC-7, Alouette III, Super Puma, Mirage IIIDS were used from Buochs, rarely was its use as alternate airport for F/A-18 .
With the exercise "REVITA" in spring 2014 Buochs was activated by the Air Command Meiringen for 4 days and there were missions with F-5E and F/A-18 flown from Buochs.

The airfield is also used for different occasions, the trade show "Iheimisch» Nidwaldner the trader was held there in May 2012 and in September of the same year, the 4th Air Show Swiss Aero Expo In July 2010, the 35th World Championship of the Army paratroopers took place in the square, parallel to this, a big concert with Bonnie Tyler was held. 
On 1 August 2014, the Airshow PC-7 Team has for the first time officially, the show flown with smoke generators on the airfield Buochs. The reason for this event was the Swiss National Day, the 25th anniversary of the PC-7 Team and the roll-out of the Pilatus PC-24. The Modellfluggruppe Nidwalden (MGN) uses the airfield.

See also
Military significance of Switzerlands Motorways
Pilatus Aircraft
RUAG

External links 

 Website of the Airport
 Sleeping Base Buochs Website of the Swiss Air Force about Buochs
 Flugplatz Buochs private Webseite about Airport Buochs

References

Notes

Airports in Switzerland
Military airbases in Switzerland